Lee Sung-jae (born 1970) is a South Korean actor.

Lee Sung-jae may also refer to:
 Lee Sung-jae (footballer born 1976), a South Korean footballer
 Lee Sung-jae (footballer born 1987), a South Korean footballer

See also
 Lee Seung-jae (disambiguation)
 Lee Sung-jea (born 1968), a South Korean footballer